AmD Technik Essex (also known as Automotive Developments) is a British car tuning company and auto racing team. The team currently competes in the British Touring Car Championship under the MB Motorsport accelerated by Blue Square banner.

History

The company was formed in 1987, specialising in the Volkswagen-Audi marque, forming their own VW-backed race team in 1990. They went on to win many championships with AmD-built and tuned Volkswagen Golfs. The company now offers tuning parts for most European cars.

For the 2008 & 2009 seasons, AmD ran SEAT Leóns in the Dunlop Sportmaxx Cup and won the championship in 2009, with Simon Shaw driving.

BTCC

In 2010, AmD Essex, under the name AmD Milltek Racing, raced in the British Touring Car Championship running a Volkswagen Golf Mk5, driven by their managing director, Shaun Hollamby. The car was previously run in the Baltic Touring Car Championship.

The team remained in the series in 2011, with Tom Onslow-Cole campaigning the Golf for the first four rounds of the season, running with a Lehmann built NGTC engine.

On Sunday 5 June, following Race 2 of round four at Oulton Park, Onslow-Cole announced he would be leaving the team following the final race of the day. Given the sudden circumstances, AmD Milltek took the decision not to field the car for the final round of the day. A day later, it emerged that Onslow-Cole was to return to his previous team, Aon Ford, to run a third car.

In the following week, it was announced that managing director Shaun Hollamby would pilot the car at round five at Croft, to give the team longer to find an appropriate replacement for Onslow-Cole. After Croft, Hollamby announced his retirement from high-level motorsport.

For the remainder of the 2011 season, the team signed former Renault Clio Cup champion, Martin Byford to drive the car.

At the Autosport International show, AmD announced that Ollie Jackson would be driving for the team during the 2012 season.

In 2013, AmD ran James Kaye in a Honda Civic for one round of the BTCC and four rounds in a Volkswagen Golf, which was also piloted by Hollamby and Aaron Mason for one round each. They sat out the Knockhill, Rockingham and Silverstone rounds of the championship.

Dave Newsham joined the team in 2014 and drove a Ford Focus ST for the season, picking up the team's first podium in race 3 at Newsham's home round at Knockhill and finished 17th in the championship.

For 2015, the team stuck with the Ford Focus ST with Mike Bushall piloting, and introduced the Audi S3 purchased from Rotek Racing to run Nicolas Hamilton for four rounds and Jake Hill at the final round at Brands Hatch.

Ollie Jackson returned to the squad in 2016 opting to run the Audi S3 and ditching the focus. Jackson completed the season in 26th place in the championship.

2017 saw AmD build a second Audi S3 for Ant Whorton-Eales to partner Jackson for the season with the two becoming regular points scorers on the way to 22nd and 23rd in the final standings.

AmD significantly expanded for the 2018 BTCC season with the purchase from the defunct Triple 8 team of a pair of race winning MG 6s. To drive the two machines, the services of young Scotsman Rory Butcher who debuted in 2017 and previous BTCC race winner Tom Boardman were called upon. AmD also retained the two Audi S3s with Jackson remaining in one for the 3rd consecutive season and youngster Sam Smelt called up to the sister car. They recorded their best season to date with Butcher regularly troubling the top points scorers. Boardman was replaced half way through the season by Ant Whorton-Eales for Snetterton, Glyn Geddie for Rockingham and Knockhill and Josh Caygill for Silverstone and Brands Hatch. Ollie Jackson also took a 3rd place finish at Brands Hatch in changeable conditions.

For 2019, AmD sold the MG 6s to new squad Exceler8 and bought a pair of Honda Civic FK2 from Eurotech, who left the series at the end of 2018. Butcher was retained for one of the new Honda seats and race-winner Sam Tordoff was brought in to partner him. Sam Tordoff was replaced after 7 rounds by Mike Bushall. The three of them secured the Independent Teams Championship with a combined 4 wins and 3 pole positions whilst Rory won both Independent Drivers title and the Jack Sears Trophy rounding off the team's most successful season to date.

TradePriceCars.com

Also in 2019, the Audi S3s were sold to Trade Price Racing but are still to be run for the team in a two year deal by AmD, with Jake Hill taking one of the Audi seats and ex F1 driver, Le Mans & Indy Car race winner Mark Blundell taking the other. Jake took the Audis 1st ever victory at Knockhill.

Jake was promoted to the AmD side of the team for 2020 and will be partnered by Sam Osborne, whilst the Trade Price Cars arm will be piloted by Bobby Thompson and ex British GT Champion James Gornall.

MB Motorsport

For 2020, a partnership with ex-F1 racer Mark Blundell was formed, taking over the running of the Honda Civics. Mark Blundell will act as sporting director of the two-car Honda programme featuring new BRDC Superstar Jake Hill and Sam Osborne, with AmD founder Shaun Hollamby retaining the position of team principal. The team merged with Motorbase Performance for 2021.

BTCC results

Notes
* Season still in progress
† Swapped teams mid season

References

External links

 http://www.amdessex.com/btcc.blog.cfm
 http://www.btccpages.com/news/1/1678/New-team-brings-VW-Golf-to-2010-BTCC/
 http://www.racecar-engineering.com/news/cars/438063/volkswagen-joins-btcc-grid.html
 http://www.crash.net/btcc/news/155825/1/amd_reveals_volkswagen_btcc_plans.html
 http://www.autosport.com/news/report.php/id/80796

British auto racing teams
British Touring Car Championship teams
British GT Championship teams
International GT Open teams
Auto racing teams established in 1990